The 2000 Summer Olympics Closing Ceremony also known as "Let's Party!" was held on 1 October 2000 in Stadium Australia. As with the opening ceremony, the closing ceremony was directed by Ric Birch as Director of Ceremonies while David Atkins was the Artistic Director and Producer. The Closing Ceremony was attended by 114,714 people, the largest attendance in modern Olympic Games history. The ceremony celebrated Australiana; Australian cultural celebrities, icons, media, and music, with floats designed in the style of Reg Mombassa. Around 2.4 billion watched the telecast of the closing ceremony.

Then IOC President Juan Antonio Samaranch declared in his concluding remarks (and his last remarks at an Olympic Games) that the 2000 Olympic games were the best Summer Olympics ever.

Attending heads of state and heads of government
 IOC President Juan Antonio Samaranch and Members of the International Olympic Committee

Host nation
 Governor-General of Australia William Deane and wife Helen Deane, Prime Minister of Australia John Howard and wife Janette Howard, Premier of New South Wales Bob Carr, SOCOG President Michael Knight, Lord Mayor of Sydney Frank Sartor

Foreign dignitaries
 Henry Kissinger former Secretary of State
 Dimitris Avramopoulos Mayor of Athens, Gianna Angelopoulos-Daskalaki President of the Athens 2004 Olympic Games Committee

Segments

Prelude
Compared to the Opening Ceremony, the stadium showed the track and field ground as is. The main stage was called the Geodome Stage and was in the center of the stadium. The Prelude segment was hosted by Roy & HG.

Just before the closing ceremony, the Men's Marathon finished in Stadium Australia. Not long after, the medal ceremony was presented which for the first time wasn't presented during the closing ceremony.  Ethiopian runner Gezahegne Abera won the Gold, Kenya's Erick Wainaina took the silver, while Gezahegne's countryman Tesfaye Tola took bronze.

Welcome & Countdown
Just before the Countdown, a slapstick skit was performed just before the countdown showing what could have gone wrong in the opening ceremony. A groundskeeper loses control of his buggy and causes havoc over the stadium and the pomp and ceremony. In one scene, Birch appears on a bike with an inflatable kangaroo featured in the 1996 closing ceremony. Finally his vehicle is dismantled in a comedic way.

A recording of the countdown composed by Richard Mills performed by Sydney Symphony Orchestra that was played before the beginning of the Opening Ceremony played again for the closing ceremony. The large screens counted down from 60 to 1. Starting at 23, footage from previous games appeared. On 0, footage of fireworks was shown followed by an image of a Ken Done drawing with the phrase "Let's Party!"

Protocol Section

My Island Home
After a brief fanfare composed by David Stanhope, Christine Anu performed with Torres Strait Island dancers her rendition of the Warumpi Band's song "My Island Home" written by Neil Murray. She performed on the Geodome Stage, with several Aboriginal dancers atop the stage, around which several hundred umbrella and lampbox kids created  images of Aboriginal Dreamtime. The version performed was the recently released Earth Beat mix,a special version letters altered to evoke the island as Australia itself. Near the end of the song, Anu was hoisted on part of the stage, which was folded into a giant 8-sided octagonal figure called The Geode, which had the globe projected on it. Audience members were encouraged to wave their flashlights.

Entrance of the Athletes

The flags from all countries entered with their flag bearers before placing their flags on the Geode stage. Then, after the flags all entered, athletes ran in from all entrances onto the field, while a fanfare 'Olympic Fireworks' by David Stanhope and orchestral piece 'Journey of Angels' by Chong Lim played. Savage Garden performed their hit song 'Affirmation' on the Geode stage while wearing indigenous flag t-shirts. The Geode stage was projected different words relating to what people might affirm about their beliefs. One of the words included Sydney's famous graffiti, Eternity.

The last time Australia hosted the Olympic Games in 1956, a young man from Melbourne, John Ian Wing, suggested that during the closing ceremony, instead of marching as separate teams, behind their national flags, the athletes mingled together as they paraded into and around the arena for a final appearance before the spectators. It was implemented then and has been an Olympic tradition that has been followed ever since.

Raising the Greek and Australian Flags
Children from both the Millennium Children's Choir of the Greek Orthodox Archdiocese of Australia and Sing 2001 Choir arrived in white and cream attire and spread themselves around the Geode stage. The Millennium Children's Choir performed "Hymn to Liberty", the National Anthem of Greece, conducted by George Ellis. Two Greece flags were raised; one as protocol to recognise the birthplace of the Olympic Games, and one to recognise Athens as the next host city. Afterwards, with the raising of the Australian Flag the Sing 2001 Children's Choir performed "Advance Australia Fair", the national anthem of Australia, conducted by George Torbay.

  Hymn to Liberty - Music by Nikolaos Mantzaros, Lyrics by Dionysios Solomos
  The National Anthem of Australia – Music & Lyrics by Peter Dodds McCormick

Closing Addresses
President of the Sydney Organising Committee for the Olympic Games (SOCOG), Michael Knight, made a closing address thanking the volunteers, the organising committee and the people of the City of Sydney. He stated: 

As he was introducing Juan Antonio Samaranch, he noted that this would be his last Olympics as President of the International Olympic Committee (IOC), and would be a special night for him, although his experience of the games came amid personal tragedy.

Juan Antonio Samaranch gave a speech echoing Knight's thanks to all those who helped organised the games. He then declared: 

Subsequent Summer Olympics held in Athens, Beijing and London have been described by Samaranch's successor Jacques Rogge as "unforgettable, dream Games", "truly exceptional" and "happy and glorious games" respectively – the practice of declaring games the "best ever" having been retired after the 2000 Games.

Samaranch then awarded the on behalf of the IOC the Gold Olympic Order to both Michael Knight, as an expression of gratitude for a perfect organisation, and John Coates, president of the Australian Olympic Committee for fulfilling the promise of making these games the athletes games. In addition, he also gave on behalf of the IOC, the Olympic Cup to the people of Sydney for their enthusiastic and unpartisan support of athletes from all countries.

Samaranch then announced the newly elected members of the International Olympic Committee Athletes' Commission:
Sergei Bubka (athletics, Ukraine)
Charmaine Crooks (athletics, Canada)
Bob Ctvrtlik (volleyball, United States of America)
Manuel Estiarte (water polo, Spain)
Susan O'Neill (swimming, Australia)
Alexander Popov (swimming, Russian Federation)
Jan Železný (athletics, Czech Republic)
Roland Baar (rowing, Germany)

'Welcome Home: Athens 2004'

This segment was conceptualized, crafted, produced and directed by the world-renowned Greek artist Vangelis, Given the importance of returning the Games to their spiritual home, Vangelis decided to include the Antwerp Ceremony (the flag handover ceremony) as a feature during the next hosts artistic section. Dimitris Avramopoulos, Mayor of Athens and Gianna Angelopoulos-Daskalaki, President of the Athens 2004 Olympic Games Committee entered the main stage. Then priestesses of Olympia, entered to enact a special and traditional rite for the Antwerp Ceremony. After their performance, the Lord Mayor of Sydney, Frank Sartor arrives with the Seoul Olympic flag to begin the ceremony. He hands it to Samaranch, who hands it over to Avramopoulos. After the ceremony, the priestesses look around the flag, take the flag off its pole, throw laurel olive branches on top and carry the flag out of the stadium to Athens. The New York Times said that this was a moment of contrast between the approach the two host cites had to the Olympic Games.

Samaranch then officially called the games to its close, calling upon the youth of the world in four years to assemble in Athens, Greece - "the birthplace of Olympism". He ended by saying thank you in 4 languages (english,french,spanish and catalan).

Olympic Flag and Hymn
As the Olympic Flag was lowered, on a separate stage near the flagpole, Australian soprano Yvonne Kenny performed the Olympic Hymn in English, composed by Spiros Samara with lyrics by Costas Palamas. The Sydney Olympics was the first time the hymn was performed in both the IOC's preferred languages.
Chong Lim's 'Journey of Angels' was then played. The final flag bearers were 8 young Australian champions:
 Lori Munz (swimming)
 Melissa Rippon (water polo)
 Anna Mcllwaine (diving)
 Mathew Belcher (sailing)
 Neil Dennis (rowing)
 Stefan Szscurowski (rowing)
 Kerrie Meares (cycling)
 Mark Renshaw (cycling)

Extinguishing the Olympic Flame - We'll Be One 
‘We'll Be One’ was performed by Nikki Webster and the Sing 2001 Choir where she performed the song on a high platform underneath the Olympic Cauldron. The song is about all of humanity coming together and becoming one. The Olympic Flame was then captured by a F-111 Jet and flew out from Olympic Park representing the start of its long journey back to Athens. (the F-111 actually performed a dump-and-burn).

Let's Party!
The Ceremony ended with an hour long party and dance mix, featuring well known culture of Australia icons.

The first two songs in the party were Absolutely Everybody by Vanessa Amorosi, who performed a special extended remix of the song,with dancers in sci-fi europop attire, and Love Is in the Air, performed by John Paul Young and ballroom dancers as a reference to the Baz Luhrmann film Strictly Ballroom. Both performed on the Geode stage.
 "Absolutely Everybody (Latino Mix)" – Performed by Vanessa Amorosi
 "Love is in the Air (Olympic samba mix)" – Performed by John Paul Young

Heroes Medley
This medley was a collection of Australian rock songs, performed on two custom stages on the left and right of the stadium, as well as the Geode stage. The stages were designed and influenced by the work of Reg Mombassa, a key Mambo artist.
 "(Back on the) Terra Firma" – Performed by Phil & Tommy Emmanuel
 "What You Need" – Performed by INXS with Jon Stevens
 "Working Class Man" – Performed by Jimmy Barnes
 "Beds Are Burning" – Performed by Midnight Oil
 "Treaty" – Performed by Yothu Yindi

Midnight Oil performance of Beds Are Burning was a second choice for organisers, as the slot was first given to The Seekers to perform The Carnival is Over. However, lead vocalist Judith Durham broke her hip and was unable to perform. The Seekers performed the song during the 2000 Paralympics closing ceremony a few weeks after, with Durham performing from a wheelchair.

Parade of Icons
This section of the dance mix began with a callback to the beginning of the opening ceremony, where the hero girl (Nikki Webster) took a day off at the beach. A large number of Surf Life Savers arrive with Kylie Minogue, dressed as a much older hero girl on a thong (Australian slang for a flip flop) before singing the ABBA song "Dancing Queen" on the Geodome stage.

Then, surrounding athletes, the parade of icons began, showing celebrities of Australiana. Each celebrity arrived on a float with performers surrounding them. The celebrities were Greg Norman, the characters of Bananas in Pyjamas, Elle Macpherson, Paul Hogan as Crocodile Dundee, and Drag Queens from The Adventures of Priscilla, Queen of the Desert.

The remix track during the parade included samples from: 
 "Theme from Jaws" - John Williams
 "Howzat" - Sherbet
 Bananas in Pyjamas theme song (Dance Mix)
 "Don't Call Me Baby" - Madison Avenue
 "Great Southern Land" - Icehouse
 "Shout" - Johnny O'Keefe
 "Finally" - Cece Peniston.

Finally, Minogue performed from the Geodome stage her recently released single "On a Night Like This".

Bye from Oz, see ya in Athens
The show ended with the whole cast performing on the Geodome Stage with Men at Work the Australian classic, "Down Under". Finally, Slim Dusty with guitar in hand performed an acoustic version of "Waltzing Matilda" as a singalong with the cast, athletes, and crowd. The Geode had projected two lines, Bye from Oz, and see ya in Athens.

Closing Night Harbour Spectacular

The 'Closing Night Harbour Spectacular' marked the end of the ceremony, with a 25-minute fireworks display starting at Homebush Bay following the Parramatta River eastward, before reaching the Sydney Harbour Bridge. After the spirit of the flame (a F-111 from earlier with the Olympic flame) flew over the Harbour Bridge, the harbour erupts with fireworks. It was the largest fireworks display staged in the world at that time, and required the work of five different pyrotechnic companies, headed by Foti Pyrotechnics.

Soundtrack:
 Olympic Fireworks - David Stanhope 
 Overture to Tannhäuser - Richard Wagner 
 Arrivals: Movements I to V - Peewee Ferris
 Symphony of a Thousand - Gustav Mahler

Legacy
A major political undertone of the Sydney Olympic ceremonies was of reconciliation between Australia and the Australian Indigenous nations. In the years leading up to the Olympics, Indigenous reconciliation was becoming a central social and political issue after the release of the Bringing Them Home report. These themes were most evident by having both Torres Strait islander and Indigenous performers for both Anu's performance of My Island Home and Yothu Yindi's performance of Treaty, Savage Garden wearing the Australian Aboriginal flag on their shirts while they performed, and including Midnight Oil's anthem Beds Are Burning while the band members performed with outfits which had the word "Sorry" (something that the then government would not apologise for).

Television coverage

Host Broadcaster: Sydney Olympic Broadcast Organisation (SOBO), with director Peter Faiman

Rightsholders:
  Australia - Seven Network
  United Kingdom - BBC
  United States - NBC
  Greece - ERT

See also
Sydney 2000 Olympic Games
 1996 Summer Olympics closing ceremony
2000 Summer Olympics opening ceremony
2004 Summer Olympics closing ceremony

References

External links
 

Closing ceremony
Olympics closing ceremonies
Ceremonies in Australia